The Church of St. Peter is a Roman Catholic church in Chennevières-sur-Marne, Val-de-Marne, France. It is partly listed as a Class Historic Monument.

History
The church belonged to the Abbey of Hiverneau de Lésigny, Essonne. It was mentioned for the first time in 1205.

It was built in the 13th century and used as a priory church in the 14th century. Pits from the construction works were discovered by archaeological excavations near the apse in 2012–3.

A part of the church was listed as a Class Historic Monument in 1920.

Description
The church was built in the Champenois style. It has a nave without transept, and a semi-circular choir with 3 apses. The archaeological works revealed shallow foundations and the presence of tombs on three levels from 14th century to the early 19th century.

References

Churches in Val-de-Marne
13th-century Roman Catholic church buildings in France
13th-century establishments in France
Monuments historiques of Île-de-France